Patsy Cline (1932–1963) was an American country singer who recorded about 100 songs during her career from 1955 through 1963. Cline has often been called one of the most influential vocalists, mostly due to the vocal delivery of her material. Considered among the best examples of her vocal delivery are the songs "Walkin' After Midnight", "I Fall to Pieces and "Crazy". These singles were also among Cline's biggest hits, all of which reached major positions on the Billboard country and pop music charts.

During her eight-year career, Cline recorded a total of 104 songs. This consisted of tracks recorded with her first label, Four Star, and tracks recorded with her second label, Decca. Her early recordings with Four Star began in 1955 and were a mixture of traditional country, traditional pop, rock and gospel. This period included "Walkin' After Midnight", which has been considered among her higher-quality material for the label. Other notable recordings from this era included "Three Cigarettes (In an Ashtray)", "I Can See an Angel" and "Gotta a Lotta Rhythm in My Soul". 

Signing with Decca Records in 1960 allowed Cline more collaborative opportunities with producer Owen Bradley. Bradley would be responsible for framing her Nashville Sound musical style that would continue until her 1963 death. In her first Decca sessions, Cline recorded "I Fall to Pieces". During her time with Decca, she also covered a variety of material that featured material from the Great American Songbook as well as standards from country music. Among these recordings was "Always", "True Love" and "Your Cheatin' Heart. At the time of Cline's death, she had recorded music that was planned for an anticipated fourth studio album. This music (among other previously-unreleased material) would later be issued in numerous compilation albums and boxed sets.

Recorded songs

References

Footnotes

Books

External links
 Patsy Cline song index at Patsified.com

Cline, Patsy